Lusongyuan Hotel is a 3-star traditional courtyard hotel in Beijing, China.  The Hotel lies in the central district of Beijing, in an old-styled Hutong in the eastern part of the city. It is surrounded by many historical buildings built from the Yuan, Ming and Qing dynasties that are still preserved today. Hutongs and quadrangles are typical Beijing architectural structures featured here. Hutongs are ancient styled lanes unique to Beijing. Quadrangles are the main structures inside hutongs.

Honors
The hotel is nominated as one of "the most distinctive courtyard" in 2009 by Beijing Tourism Industry Association. The hotel is highly popular, with many overseas guests come to the hotel, mainly to have a taste of traditional Chinese culture.

See also

 Hutong
 List of hotels in Beijing

Footnotes

External links
Hotel Comments
  Hotels in Beijing

Hotels in Beijing